is a Japanese manga series written by Yoshiki Sakurai and Team G.V. and illustrated by Kuroko Yabuguchi. A live action film adaptation was released on November 19, 2011.

Cast
 Yūki Kaji as Siraike Yū
 Wataru Hatano as Kubodera Tatsuma
 Showtaro Morikubo as Oda Hareruya
 Daisuke Namikawa as Kobayakawa Ku’on
 Romi Park as Takeda Sayuri
 Mamoru Miyano as Asai Kanade
 Hiroshi Kamiya as Narrator
 Mayumi Tanaka
 Masako Nozawa
 Yoshimasa Hosoya 
 Shigeru Chiba
 Keaton Yamada
 Rikiya Koyama
 Kōichi Yamadera
 Michio Hazama
 Roko Takizawa
 Takuya Eguchi as Tetsurō
 Arthur Lounsbery as Cristian
 Asuma as Rodriguez
 Kōhei Aoyama as Titan
 Ayumi Okamura as Light
 Mizuki Sako as Iwashimizu
 Tarou Tanaka as DJ Yoshi
 Kunihiro Maeda as Pompadour
 Yūki Matsuoka as Big four–eyes Kikuchi
 Teruya Mori as Rin
 Kazuya Yamaguchi

References

External links
  

2011 manga
Live-action films based on manga
Films directed by Tomoki Sano
Shōnen manga
Manga adapted into films
2010s Japanese films